Valdis is a Latvian language masculine given name. It is derived from two possible sources; from the Latvian word valdīt ("rule") or as a shortened form of Valdemārs, the Latvian form of Waldemar. Valdis may refer to the following:
Valdis Birkavs (born 1942), Latvian politician and Prime Minister of Latvia
Valdis Celms (born 1943), Latvian artist and neopagan leader
Valdis Dombrovskis (born 1971), Latvian politician, Prime Minister of Latvia (2009–2013)
Valdis Ģīlis (born 1954), Latvian politician
Valdis Mintals (born 1979), Estonian figure skater
Valdis Muižnieks (1935–2013), Latvian basketball player
Valdis Muktupāvels (born 1958), Latvian ethnomusicologist, composer, musician and teacher
Valdís Óskarsdóttir (born 1950), Icelandic film editor
Valdis Pelšs (born 1967), Latvian-born Russian television personality, musical artist and actor
Valdis Pultraks (1922–1972), Latvian footballer 
Valdis Valters (born 1957), Latvian basketball player
Valdis Zatlers (born 1955), Latvian politician, President of Latvia (2007–2011)
Valdis Zeps (1932–1996), Latvian-American linguist and professor

Latvian masculine given names